The Itaimbezinho is a canyon in Brazil between the states of Rio Grande do Sul and  Santa Catarina, about 170 km from Porto Alegre. It is part of the Aparados da Serra National Park.

References

Canyons and gorges of Brazil